Celestair is an alliance of Air Burkina, Air Mali and Air Uganda.

Fleet 
Celestair Group represents an alliance of three airlines under the Aga Khan Fund for Economic Development, AKFED, and  benefits from technical and operative support from other airlines owned by the Aga Khan, such as Meridiana and Eurofly of Italy.  
The Celestair fleet consists of the following aircraft (as of March 2009 ): 
8 McDonnell Douglas MD-87 (three aircraft are operated for Air Uganda, two aircraft are operated for Air Burkina and two aircraft are operated for Air Mali).  
At least 1 Bombardier CRJ (seen July 2014)

Members

External links 
Celestair Fleet

Aga Khan Development Network
Airline holding companies